Poslednie Tanki V Parizhe (Последние танки в Париже; abbreviated П.Т.В.П., PTVP, or PTWP) is a Russian punk rock band from Saint-Petersburg. The band's name translates as The Last Tanks in Paris.

The group was founded in 1996 and has released six full-length albums in Russia. It was formed by drummer Edward Starkov and vocalist Alexei Nikonov. The group has intimated that their latest album, 2008's Zerkalo, will be the last they release on CD, believing it to be a dying medium. They are noted for their strong views against authoritarianism in Russian politics, and have repeatedly denounced the actions of Vladimir Putin in their lyrics. At the time the group first formed, it was one of comparatively few political rock bands in Russia, many of the anti-communist bands of the 1980s having broken up or moved into mainstream music after the dissolution of the Soviet Union. However, over the course of the 2000s, PTVP has become one of several well-known bands with outspoken political viewpoints in Russian rock music.

Members 
Alexei Nikonov - vocals
Anton Dokuchaev - guitar
Iegor Nedviga - bass, backing vocals
Denis Krivtsov - drums

Discography
Studio albums
 1998 — Девственность (Virginity)
 1999 — Порномания (Pornomania)
 2001 — Гексаген (Hexagene)
 2004 — 2084
 2007 — Свобода слова (Freedom of Speech)
 2008 — Зеркало (The Mirror)
 2010 — Порядок вещей (The Order of Things)
 2012 — Ультиматум (The Ultimatum)
 2014 — Ключи от всех дверей (The Skeleton Key)

Singles, EPs, Demos
 1996: Olkaa Hyuve (single) (Finnish "You are Welcome")
 1996: Собаки в глазах (single) (Dogs in your Eyes)
 1998: Кировский / Дачный / Ласковый Муй Акустика (Kirovsky, Dachny (Suburban), My Tender Acoustics)
 1999: Порномания 99 (Pornomania 99)
 2001: Враньёмиксы (Lies Mix)
 2001: Гексаген (Переиздание’04) (Hexagene, Reissued '04)
 2002: Девствительность (Live) (Untraslatable portmanteau word, fusion of Reality and Virginity)
 2002: Может быть Хуже (Live in Moloko 10-07-2002) (Might be worse)
 2003: Кровь и Сперма (Live in Oplandina 2003) (Blood and Sperm)
 2004: Евростандарт (single) (Eurostandard)
 2005: 2085
 2005: Свобода cлова (Demo) (Freedom of Speech)
 2006: Зелёные поезда (Acoustic, Live in Вологда 20-05-2006) (Green Trains) (Live in Vologda)
 2006: Техника Быстрой Записи (The Technique of Speedy Recording)
 2007: Обычный день (Media EP) (An Ordinary Day)
 2009: Репортаж с петлёй на шее (EP) (Chimera cover)

DVD
 2007: Права человека (Live in Oplandina 02-05-2006) (Human Rights)

References

Musical groups from Saint Petersburg
Russian punk rock groups